Carlos José Caballero (13 September 1917 – 2 October 1981) was de facto Federal Interventor of Córdoba, Argentina from September 13, 1966 to June 16, 1969.

References

1917 births
1981 deaths
Governors of Córdoba Province, Argentina
People from Córdoba, Argentina